Nunhead railway station is in the Nunhead area of the London Borough of Southwark. The station is managed by Thameslink. It is in Travelcard Zone 2.

Services 

The typical off-peak service in trains per hour is:

 2 tph to 
 2 tph to London Blackfriars
 2 tph to  via 
 2 tph to  via 

In addition, the service to London Blackfriars is extended to and from  via .

History 

The Crystal Palace and South London Junction Railway from Canterbury Road Junction, near Brixton to Crystal Palace (High Level) was opened by the London, Chatham and Dover Railway (LCDR) on 1 August 1865, to take passengers to the Crystal Palace. Train services on the Crystal Palace High Level line ceased in 1917–1919 and 1944-1946 for wartime economies. The line closed to all traffic on 20 September 1954.

The Greenwich Park branch opened 1871 as far as Blackheath Hill, with the final stretch opening in 1888. It closed on 1 January 1917 for wartime economies. The Catford Loop line opened on 1 July 1892, giving a second route out of London for the LCDR, and Nunhead became a three-way junction.

In 1925 the lines were electrified, and a new station at Nunhead was built on the London side of the original site. In 1929 the Greenwich Park branch was reopened as far as the site of Lewisham Road where a new connecting line to Lewisham enabled cross-London freight trains to be re-routed to Hither Green. The line was electrified in 1935 for peak hour passenger trains. There is now a frequent service of passenger trains.

Connections
London Buses route P12 serves the station.

References

Further reading

 Crystal Palace (High Level) and Catford Loop by V Mitchell & K Smith, Middleton Press, 1991
 The Railway through Sydenham Hill Wood, From the Nun's Head to the Screaming Alice by Mathew Frith, The Friends of the Great North Wood and London Wildlife Trust leaflet, 1995
 London's Local Railways by A A Jackson, David & Charles, 1978
 The Crystal Palace (High Level) Branch by W Smith, British Railway Journal 28, 1989

External links 

 Photographs of original station

Railway stations in the London Borough of Southwark
Former Southern Railway (UK) stations
Railway stations in Great Britain opened in 1871
Railway stations served by Southeastern
Former London, Chatham and Dover Railway stations
Railway station
Railway stations served by Govia Thameslink Railway